William Robert "Jock" McKenzie (31 October 1911 – 16 June 1989) was an Australian rules footballer who played with South Melbourne and Fitzroy in the VFL during the 1930s.

Family
The son of John McKenzie and Elizabeth Helen Jane McKenzie, née Green, William Robert McKenzie (and his twin brother James Frank McKenzie) were born at Warburton on 31 October 1911.

Football
McKenzie started his career in 1931 with South Melbourne where he played in the back pocket, enjoying premiership success in 1933. He left the club for Fitzroy during the 1936 season and was used up forward, kicking 33 goals in 1938. In 1940 he returned to South Melbourne for his final season in the Victorian Football League. He later played with Oakleigh in the Victorian Football Association.

War Service
McKenzie enlisted in the Australian Army during World War II and served in transport units in Victoria and Queensland.

References

External links

Jock McKenzie's playing statistics from The VFA Project

1911 births
1989 deaths
Sydney Swans players
Sydney Swans Premiership players
Fitzroy Football Club players
Australian players of Australian rules football
One-time VFL/AFL Premiership players
People from Yarra Ranges
Australian Army personnel of World War II
Military personnel from Victoria (Australia)
Australian twins
Twin sportspeople